Francis Arnold may refer to:

 Frances Arnold (born 1956), American scientist and engineer
 Francis Arnold House
 Francis Arnold, see List of works by William Hogarth

See also
Frank Arnold (disambiguation)